The 169th Pennsylvania House of Representatives District is located in South Eastern Pennsylvania and has been represented by Kate Klunk since 2014.

District profile
The 169th Pennsylvania House of Representatives District is located in York County, Pennsylvania and includes the following areas: 

 Codorus Township
 Glen Rock
 Hanover
 Heidelberg Township
 Jefferson
 Manheim Township
 New Freedom
 Penn Township
 Railroad
 Shrewsbury Township
 West Manheim Township

Representatives

Recent election results

2010

2012

2014

2016

References

External links
District map from the United States Census Bureau
Pennsylvania House Legislative District Maps from the Pennsylvania Redistricting Commission.  
Population Data for District 44 from the Pennsylvania Redistricting Commission.

Government of York County, Pennsylvania
169